Rukometni klub Zagreb is a men's professional handball club from Zagreb, Croatia. It competes in the 
Croatian Premier League, SEHA League, and the EHF Champions League.

RK Zagreb won 33 national championships and won the national cup 27 times. The club was also European champion twice and played another four times in the finals, and is among top eight most successful handball clubs in the EHF Champions League's history.

Accomplishments

Individual Club Awards 

 Double
 Winners (29): 1961–62, 1990–91, 1991–92, 1992–93, 1993–94, 1994–95, 1995–96, 1996–97, 1997–98, 1998–99, 1999–00, 2002–03, 2003–04, 2004–05, 2005–06, 2006–07, 2007–08, 2008–09, 2009–10, 2010–11, 2011–12, 2012–13, 2013–14, 2014–15, 2015–16, 2016–17, 2017–18, 2018–19, 2020–21 
 Triple Crown
 Winners (2): 1991–92, 1992–93

Kits

Current squad
Squad for the 2022–23 season

               
Goalkeepers
 12  Dino Slavić
 16  Aljaž Panjtar
 25  Matej Mandić
Left wingers
6  Davor Ćavar
 20  Gabriel Buvinić
 31  Timur Dibirov
Right wingers
 17  Paolo Kraljević
 24  Vlado Matanović
 27  Ivan Čupić
  Hrvoje Ceković
Line Players
8  Adin Faljić
 22  Željko Musa
 71  Nikola Grahovac

Left backs
5  Miloš Kos 
 10  Jakov Gojun
 11  Zvonimir Srna
 13  Edin Klis
 43  Aleks Kavčič
 87  Vuko Borozan
Central backs
 23  Karpo Sirotić
 44  Stefan Dodić
Right backs 
9  Luka Lovre Klarica
 55  Csaba Leimeter

Transfers
Transfers for the season 2023–24

Joining
  Ante Grbavac (GK) (from  Rebi Balonmano Cuenca)
  Matic Suholežnik (P) (from  RK Celje)
  Gianfranco Pribetić (P) (from  RK Nexe Našice) ?

Leaving
  Dino Slavić (GK) (to  Limoges Handball) ?
  Csaba Leimeter (RB) (to  HBW Balingen-Weilstetten)
  Hrvoje Ceković (RW) (end of loan  HRK Gorica)
  Željko Musa (P) (to  HC Kriens-Luzern) 
  Nikola Grahovac (P) (to  HBW Balingen-Weilstetten)

Technical staff

  Chairman: Zoran Gobac 
  Manager: Božidar Jović
  Head coach: Ivica Obrvan
  Assistant coach: Denis Špoljarić 
  Assistant coach: Tonči Valčić 
  Goalkeeper coach: Arian Jović
  Condition coach: Šime Tomašević 
  Physiotherapist: Damir Kajba
  Physioterapist: Slobodan Škorić

RK Zagreb in European handball

As of 18 November 2018

Notable former players

  Igor Vori
  Tonči Valčić
  Josip Valčić
  Patrik Ćavar
  Slavko Goluža
  Nenad Kljaić
  Bruno Gudelj
  Alvaro Načinović
  Božidar Jović
  Željko Babić
  Valter Matošević
  Vladimir Jelčić
  Mirko Bašić
  Valner Franković
  Vladimir Šujster
  Venio Losert
  Davor Dominiković
  Mirza Džomba
  Vlado Šola
  Blaženko Lacković
  Ivano Balić
  Renato Sulić
  Vedran Zrnić
  Damir Bičanić
  Nikola Blažičko
  Ivan Ninčević
  Domagoj Duvnjak
  Marko Kopljar
  Jakov Gojun
  Zlatko Horvat
  Goran Šprem
  Nikša Kaleb
  Denis Špoljarić
  Manuel Štrlek
  Ljubo Vukić
  Drago Vuković
  Marino Marić
  Mateo Hrvatin
  Ivan Pešić
  Ilija Brozović
  Luka Stepančić
  Filip Ivić
  Ivan Stevanović
  Darko Cingesar (2016–2017)
  David Špiler
  Beno Lapajne
  Dragan Gajić
  Rolando Pušnik
  Iztok Puc
  Gorazd Škof
  David Miklavčič 
  Kiril Lazarov
  Lazo Majnov
  Mitko Stoilov
  Branislav Angelovski
  Risto Arnaudovski
  Velko Markoski
  Nenad Kosteski
  Nikola Prce
  Duško Čelica
  Mirsad Terzić
  Zlatko Saračević
  Irfan Smajlagić
  Gyula Gál
  Dávid Katzirz
  Petar Kapisoda
  Dobrivoje Marković
  Lujo Györy
  Zdenko Zorko
  Goran Stojanović
  Frank Løke
  Rareș Lucian Jurcă 
  Andrey Lavrov 
  Wang Quan

Head coaches

Kasim Kamenica (1988–1990) 
Zdravko Zovko (1990–1994)
Vinko Kandija (1994–1995)
Abas Arslanagić (1995–1996)
Josip Glavaš (1996–1998)
Velimir Kljaić (1998–1999)
Zdravko Zovko (1999–2000) 
Lino Červar (2000–2001)
Nino Marković (2001–2003)
Silvio Ivandija (2003) 
Lino Červar (2004–2009)
Ivica Obrvan (2009–2012)
Slavko Goluža (2012–2013) 
Boris Dvoršek (2013–2014)
Veselin Vujović (2014–2016)
Andrija Nikolić (2016) (interim)
Silvio Ivandija (2016–2017)
Slavko Goluža (2017; interim) 
Kasim Kamenica (2017)
Zlatko Saračević (2017–2018)
Lino Červar (2018) 
Branko Tamše (2019)
Veselin Vujović (2019–2020)
Igor Vori (2020) 
Vlado Šola (2020–2021) 
Ivica Obrvan (2021–2022)
Slavko Goluža (2022–present)

References

External links
Official website

 
Zagreb
Zagreb
Handball clubs established in 1922
1922 establishments in Croatia